Pierre Derivery (4 November 1925 – 24 November 2013) was a French sprint canoer who competed from the early 1950s to the early 1960s. Competing in two Summer Olympics, he earned his best finish of tenth in the K-1 10000 m event at Helsinki in 1952.

References

Pierre Derivery's profile at Sports Reference.com
Pierre Derivery's obituary 

1925 births
2013 deaths
Canoeists at the 1952 Summer Olympics
Canoeists at the 1960 Summer Olympics
French male canoeists
Olympic canoeists of France